Rivière-des-Prairies–Pointe-aux-Trembles is a suburban borough (arrondissement) on the eastern tip of the city of Montreal, Quebec, Canada.  It is located at the eastern end of the Island of Montreal.

Geography

The borough is located at the eastern tip of the Island of Montreal. It is composed of the districts of Rivière-des-Prairies, Pointe-aux-Trembles and La Pointe-aux-Prairies, which were part of the City of Montreal prior to the 2002 municipal mergers. Prior to 2002, it was an exclave separated from the rest of Montreal by independent cities to the west. From January 1, 2002 to January 1, 2006, the borough included the town of Montreal East, which has now demerged from Montreal.

The borough's name lists the two neighbourhoods according to their date of annexation to Montreal (Rivière-des-Prairies joined in 1963 and Pointe-aux-Trembles in 1982).  It has a population of 102,457.

Rivière-des-Prairies is mainly composed of suburbs, as well as multiple forested areas and fields. Pointe-aux-trembles is more urban and dense but remains suburban in nature. The third district, La Pointe-aux-Prairies, is a typical suburb composed of townhouses, condos and single-family dwellings, which makes it a destination of choice for young families that wish to remain on the island of Montréal.  The Saint Lawrence River flows at the southern border of Montreal, while the Rivière des Prairies River forms Montreal Island's northern boundary with Laval.

Demographics

The Rivière-des-Prairies part of the borough is more multiethnic and known for its high concentration of Italians and Haitians, while the Pointe-aux-Trembles segment is more homogenous and ethnically French-Canadian. On July 9, 2006, after Italy won the 2006 FIFA World Cup, Maurice Duplessis Boulevard was closed to traffic due to the great number of fans celebrating in the street.

Politics

The borough is divided into three districts—La Pointe-aux-Prairies, Pointe-aux-Trembles and Rivière-des-Prairies—and has seven elected representatives since the November 2005 municipal election: one borough mayor, three city councillors, and three borough councillors.

As of the November 5, 2017 Montreal municipal election, the current borough council consists of the following councillors:

Federally it's in the ridings of Honoré-Mercier and La Pointe-de-l'Île, and provincially part of LaFontaine and Pointe-aux-Trembles.

Education
The Borough is served by two school boards. The French schools are part of the Centre de Service Scolaire Pointe-de-l'Ile while the English schools are part of the English Montreal School Board.

Francophone schools:
 Secondary schools: École secondaire Jean-Grou, École secondaire Pointe-aux-Trembles, and École secondaire Daniel-Johnson
 There are 14 Francophone primary schools in the borough.

Anglophone schools:
 Leonardo Da Vinci elementary school
 Michelangelo elementary school
 East Hill elementary school
 *Lester B. Pearson High School serves as the high school for Rivière-des-Prairies-Pointe-aux-Trembles although it is in Montreal-North.

The borough is served by the Pointe-aux-Trembles and Rivière-des-Prairies branches of the Montreal Public Libraries Network.

Additional information

From 2002 to 2006, borough headquarters were located in Montreal East's town hall, which benefitted from a $5 million expansion voted in 2003 and completed in September 2005.  Since the town's demerger, the borough's services have been relocated in both Rivière-des-Prairies and Pointe-aux-Trembles, but a recent proposal to build a new borough hall next to the planned Rivière-des-Prairies Maison de la Culture (cultural centre) has been adopted despite the ire of the Pointe-aux-Trembles councillors.
The borough is covered by three weekly newspapers, two in French ("L'Avenir de l'Est" in Pointe-aux-Trembles and "L'Informateur" in Rivière-des-Prairies) and one in English ("The East End Suburban", which covers only Rivière-des-Prairies).

See also
 Boroughs of Montreal
 Districts of Montreal
 Municipal reorganization in Quebec
 Rivière des Prairies the river.

References

External links
Borough website (in French)
L'Avenir de l'Est (French)
L'Informateur de Rivière-des-Prairies (French)
The East End Suburban

 
Boroughs of Montreal
Quebec populated places on the Saint Lawrence River
Canada geography articles needing translation from French Wikipedia